Kanniyakumari railway station, formerly Cape Comorin railway station, (station code: CAPE) is a railway terminus of the Indian Railways serving the coastal town of Kanniyakumari in the state of Tamil Nadu.

Administration
It is a part of the Thiruvananthapuram railway division of Southern Railway zone. It's the southernmost railway station in India.

Services
Several express trains connect Kanyakumari with the rest of India. Two of the longest trains operated by the Indian Railways — Dibrugarh–Kanyakumari Vivek Express  and Himsagar Express  depart from here. It has daily trains to Chennai, Bangalore and Mumbai as well as direct trains for Rameswaram, New Delhi, Howrah,  Jammu, Dibrugarh, Thiruvananthapuram and other cities.

Gallery

References

External links 

Railway stations in Kanyakumari district
Railway terminus in India
Thiruvananthapuram railway division
Transport in Kanyakumari